North Koel River flows through the Indian state of Jharkhand.

Course
The North Koel rises on the Chhota Nagpur plateau and enters Latehar district  , below Netarhat near Rud.

In many places the reaches of this river present scene of great beauty and sometimes even of grandeur, such as the rocky bed and rapids north of Hutar and the gorge at Kutku.

Mention may be made of the metamorphic rocks which form the watershed between the North Koel and the Damodar to the west of the Chandwa-Balumath road.

The North Koel, along with its tributaries, meanders through the northern part of Betla National Park.

Tributaries
Another tributary is the Burha, which joins the North Koel above Kutku at Bagechampa.

North Koel Project
The North Koel project is being implemented at Mandal near Kutku. This Dam will be known as Kutku Dam. Hydro-electric power generation would be 2 x 12 MW. The project would flood 56 villages, of which 8 are within the core area of the Palamau Tiger Reserve.

In 1974, this project was started promising to irrigate  of farmlands of Palamu, Latehar, Garhwa of Jharkhand as well as of Gaya, Aurangabad, Jehanabad and Arawal of neighbouring Bihar.

The recent push has come following the efforts of MPs from Chatra Sunil Singh, Palamu’s VD Ram and of Aurangabad, Gaya and Jehanabad. The concerted effort has brought Bihar in agreement on reducing height of the dam by four meters. "Bihar Government has agreed to it and this would reduce submerged area by 860 hectares by bringing it to 51136 hectares," said an official of Water Resources Department, adding that catchment area would go up to 128 km.

The dam over North Koyel River is said to have had completed 90% of its work in 1993 when it stopped. The reason was the amendment of the Forest (Conservation) Rules 1981 the previous year, which tightened the conditions for getting forest clearances. Till that time, there was no need for detailed forest clearances. The new requirements however mandated that any proposal for converting forest land to non-forest land had to be evaluated by a Committee who would assess whether the proposed land formed a part of a nature reserve or national park. Since the nearby Palamau Tiger Reserve was under threat of flooding because of the project, the government at the time chose to abandon the project.

The unfinished dam has a height of 67.86 meters and length 278 meters. Nine gates had to be stalled and most of the turbines were brought to the place. Following the abandonment of the project, the entire setup and resources have vanished now, leaving the locals in peace to continue their traditional way of life.

Apparently, out of 634 families of 17 submerged villages, a majority of 555 had been paid compensation. However, locals remaining in the villages today claim that the compensation was received by their forefathers. It is important that they also receive adequate money and land to compensate for the hardships they would face as a result of flooding of their homes . They are not principally opposed to the project, only because there are promises that the project will benefit them by irrigating dried land and generating 24 MW hydro power.

Therefore it is up to the government to ensure not only that the proposed benefits of the project actually reach the local people, but also that they are adequately compensated and rehabilitated before being displaced. For this it is important to take consensus and engage with the locals.

References

Rivers of Jharkhand
Tributaries of the Son River
Rivers of India